Shangyuan railway station is a railway station located in Zhudong Township, Hsinchu County, Taiwan. It is located on the Neiwan line and is operated by the Taiwan Railways Administration.

Around the station
 Rueylong Museum

References

1970 establishments in Taiwan
Railway stations in Hsinchu County
Railway stations opened in 1970
Railway stations served by Taiwan Railways Administration